Emiliano García Escudero (born 25 November 2003) is a Mexican professional footballer who plays as a forward for Liga MX club Puebla.

Career statistics

Club

References

2003 births
Living people
Mexican footballers
Mexico youth international footballers
Spanish footballers
Association football forwards
Liga MX players
Club Puebla players
Villarreal CF players
Footballers from Mexico City